FACTOR (the Foundation to Assist Canadian Talent on Records) is a private non-profit organization "dedicated to providing assistance toward the growth and development of the Canadian music industry".

FACTOR was founded in 1982 by radio broadcasters CHUM, Rogers Radio Broadcasting, Moffat Communications, along with the Canadian Independent Record Production Association and the Canadian Music Publishers Association. FACTOR has been administering public money since 1986 when it began to grow significantly. From an inaugural budget of $200,000 CAD, they now distribute over $11.5 million annually.

The merit-based approach of monetary distribution used by FACTOR and Canadian music video funding organization VideoFACT, is not without critics.  In 2009, the organizations came under public scrutiny when a letter written by Unfamiliar Records founder Greg Ipp was republished on the internet - in turn promoting the idea that bigger image-based bands shouldn’t be getting such a huge amount of those finite funds as it leaves relatively little, if any, funding for the smaller up-and-coming bands.

Notable recording artists who have received FACTOR grants include:
Absolutely Free
Alexisonfire
Alvvays
Jann Arden
BADBADNOTGOOD
Bedouin Soundclash
Blue Rodeo
Canadian Brass
BOY
Jason Collett
Comeback Kid
Courage My Love
The Dears
Devin Townsend
Diemonds
Die Mannequin
The Flatliners
Flowers of Hell
Fucked Up
Grimes
Hey Rosetta!
The Johnstones
July Talk
K'naan
Mark Sultan
Metric
Michael Kulas
Moneen
No Joy
Northcote
Our Lady Peace
Propaghandi
Protest The Hero
PUP
Sam Roberts
Sean Kelly
Silverstein
Spiritbox
The Standstills
Timber Timbre
T. Nile
Tristam
The Trews
Wolf Parade
Woodpigeon
Xavier Rudd
Yukon Blonde
Zeds Dead

References

External links 

FACTOR: The History - Canadian Communication Foundation

Music organizations based in Canada